Gilling is a figure in Norse mythology.

Gilling or Gillings may also refer to:

Placename in Yorkshire, England
 Gilling Abbey
 Gilling East, village
 Gilling Castle
 Gilling railway station
 Gilling West, village
 Gilling with Hartforth and Sedbury, civil parish

People with the surname
 John Gilling (1912–1984), film director
 Rebecca Gilling (born 1953), actress
 Richard Gillings, archdeacon
 Zoe Gillings (born 1985), snowboarder

Other
 Gilling (textiles), combing fibres in textile manufacture